Wang Shi may refer to:

Wang Shi (Tang dynasty) (fl. 9th century), Chinese official and general of the Tang Dynasty
Wang Shi (entrepreneur) (born 1951), Chinese businessman
Wang Shi (fencer), Chinese fencer